MKS Cracovia SSA, commonly referred to as Cracovia Kraków and currently playing as Comarch Cracovia for sponsorship reasons, is an ice hockey team in Kraków, Poland. With 12 Polish Championships (as of 2022), it is one of the most accomplished Polish ice hockey teams. They play in the Polska Hokej Liga, the country's top division.

History

Founded in 1906, Cracovia is the oldest existing sports club in Poland. Ice hockey in the form of bandy had been first played around 1909, and the first North American style ice hockey game was played in 1912. The ice hockey section of the sports club was created in 1923. Currently, the men's ice hockey section functions independently, and is legally called MKS Cracovia SSA. The women's section continues to function under the sports society of KS Cracovia.

The men's professional team won five league titles in the 1930s and 1940s. It took them 57 years to win another league title after winning in 1949. They finally won the PLH again in 2006, and have since added six more titles, in 2008, 2009, 2011, 2013, 2016 and 2017.

They are also the first Polish team to compete in the Champions Hockey League. They made their debut in the 2016–17 edition, where they were put into a group with Färjestad BK from the Swedish Hockey League and HC Sparta Praha from the Czech Extraliga. They would lose all four group stage matches.

Achievements
 Polish champions (12 times): 1937, 1946, 1947, 1948, 1949, 2006, 2008, 2009, 2011, 2013, 2016, 2017.
 Polish Cup winners (3 times): 2013, 2015, 2021.
 Polish SuperCup winners (3 times): 2014, 2016, 2017.
 IIHF Continental Cup: 2022.
 Polish 1. Liga champion (4 times): 1965, 1967, 1977, 2004.

Players

Current roster

References

External links
 Official site

Ice hockey teams in Poland
Sport in Kraków
MKS Cracovia
1923 establishments in Poland
Ice hockey clubs established in 1923